Carmen MacDonald (born December 4, 1992) is a retired ice hockey goaltender, most recently playing for the St. Lawrence Saints, a university team from New York state that plays in the Eastern College Athletic Conference (ECAC).

Playing career
MacDonald participated with the 2010 and 2011 New England champions at the Westminster School. She is also a field hockey and softball player.

NCAA
In December 2010, she committed to join the St. Lawrence Saints of the ECAC. On January 20 and 21, 2012, she backstopped the Skating Saints to a record of 1-0-1 in a home series versus the Clarkson Golden Knights. She posted a 49 save percentage during the series, helping the Saints extend their unbeaten streak to nine games. During February 2012, MacDonald registered a 7-1-0 record as the Skating Saints tied for fourth in the ECAC conference standings. In addition, she set a new Skating Saints single-season shutout record with 6. Of note, three of her shutouts came in February. In a match against Dartmouth, she made 32 saves to eliminate Dartmouth and advance to the ECAC Semifinals. MacDonald played a total of 125 games for St. Lawrence.

Hockey Canada
MacDonald was part of Canada women's national under-18 ice hockey team and won a gold medal at the 2010 IIHF World Women's Under-18 Championship in Chicago. As a member of the gold medal winning squad, a hockey card of her was featured in the Upper Deck 2010 World of Sports card series. In addition, she participated in the Canada Celebrates Event on June 30 in Edmonton, Alberta which recognized the Canadian Olympic and World hockey champions from the 2009-10 season .

Career stats

Hockey Canada

Awards and honours
ECAC Rookie of the Week (Week of January 24, 2012)
Nominee, 2012 ECAC Rookie of the Year
ECAC Goaltender of the Month Award (February 2012) 
ECAC Rookie of the Month Award (February 2012)
ECAC All-Rookie Team (2011–12)
ECAC Goaltender of the Week (Week of January 7, 2013)

References

1992 births
Living people
Canadian women's ice hockey goaltenders
Ice hockey people from Nova Scotia
People from Pictou County